Courtney Hansen is an American television host/personality, syndicated columnist, published author, and former fashion model.

Biography
Courtney Hansen was born on October 2, 1974 in Minneapolis, Minnesota, to Gerald John "Jerry" and Constance (Walker) Hansen. Her father is a winner of 27 SCCA national racing championships. From 1973-2006 her family owned Brainerd International Raceway and she grew up in Orono, Minnesota, and spent much time around the pits and garages at racing tracks. As a result, she is an automobile enthusiast, and much of her work to date has revolved around automobiles. Courtney Hansen married Jay Hartington, her longtime boyfriend and father of her child, on July 21, 2018 in Taormina, Italy.

Career
After graduating with a degree in marketing from Florida State University, she undertook a corporate job in marketing. After leaving the corporate world, Hansen hosted the Jack Nicklaus pilot Killer Golf and segments on the Travel Channel, worked as a fashion and fitness model, and was on the cover of Hot Rod Magazine, Muscle & Fitness and other major magazines.

Hansen's first major TV role was co-host of the hit car makeover series Overhaulin'. She went on to host Spike TV's Powerblock, which was composed of four half-hour automotive shows, for eight seasons. She hosted a special for Spike TV called Great Builds., was host of the travel adventure series "Destination Wild" for Fox Sports Net, which won a Telly Award. In the past she hosted for TLC's automotive-themed shows Rides, and Million Dollar Motors. Hansen has been a spokes-model for Matco Tools, Dodge, and Rolls-Royce. Her participation in Overhaulin was far from superficial; she helped with the disassembling and assembly of cars for the show.

Additionally, Hansen wrote a column for FHM, and has written a nationally syndicated automotive newspaper column titled "Courtney Hansen: Full Throttle" since 2005. She is the published author of The Garage Girl's Guide To Everything You Need To Know About Your Car, a book offering women and first time car buyers advice on how to care for their cars.

Hansen hosted Autoweek's Vinsetta Garage for Discovery Channel's Velocity network. The show was named after Vinsetta Garage, a century-old Detroit landmark that Autoweek Magazine saved from demolition. The garage serviced everything from carriages to Ford Model Ts to Chevrolet Corvettes.

In January 2014 Hansen started duties as host of the new NBC Sports, Spike TV and CBS Sports TV series PowerNation'', and was the spokesperson for Endurance Warranty Services, LLC Endurance Warranty until 2017.

On 5 July 2014 she had her first child, Holland Marysia Walker Hartington, a daughter with 35-year-old entrepreneur, Jay Hartington (owner of Rumbatime and MarissaCollections.com, among other ventures).

Hansen dated "Idiotest" host Ben Gleib in 2006–2007.

Courtney announced she is leaving Powernation at the end of 2015 to pursue other endeavors.

Notes

1974 births
Living people
Actresses from Minneapolis
Television personalities from Los Angeles
American women television personalities
Florida State University alumni
Actresses from Los Angeles
Writers from Minneapolis
Writers from Los Angeles
Female models from Minnesota
People from Orono, Minnesota
21st-century American women